Wrecking Ball Press is an independent poetry & prose publishing company, based in Hull, East Riding of Yorkshire, England.  Wrecking Ball Press was established and is edited by Shane Rhodes; it was born in the back of a café.

Wrecking Ball Press produces regular anthology 'The Reater' as well as live events.  Other publications include Dan Fante Corksucker, Richard Adams (author) Daniel, Roddy Lumsden Roddy Lumsden is Dead, Ben Myers The Book Of Fuck and Tony O'Neill Digging the Vein.

Some writers and poets appearing on Wrecking Ball Press

 Richard Adams (author)  Daniel  (hb)  (special signed edition)
 Elizabeth Barrett  The Bat Detector 
 Matthew Caley  The Scene of my Former Triumph 
 Brendan Cleary  Stranger in the House 
 Tim Cumming  Contact Print 
 Fiona Curran  The Hail Mary Pass 
 Dan Fante  Corksucker   A Gin Pissing, Raw Meat, Dual Carburettor V-8 Son-of-a-Bitch from Los Angeles 
 Geoff Hattersley  Harmonica 
 Mark Kotting  Nappy Rash  with foreword by UK comedian and writer Sean Lock.
 Gerald Locklin  the case of the missing blue volkswagen 
 Roddy Lumsden  Roddy Lumsden is Dead 
 Daithidh MacEochaidh  Travels with Chinaski 
 Ben Myers  The Book of Fuck 
 Tony O'Neill  Digging the Vein 
 Milner Place  caminante 
 Eva Salzman  ONE TWO II 
 Jules Smith  ART, SURVIVAL AND SO FORTH: The Poetry of Charles Bukowski 
 Adam Strickson  An Indian Rug surprised by Snow 
 Jon Smith  Toytopia

Anthologies 
 The Reater
 Reater 1   New British writing with the best of Southern California: great names of L.A./Long Beach literature, with photographs by James Brown & Simon Rees.
 Reater 2   Contributors include Seamus Curran,  Joan Jobe Smith, Fred Voss, with artwork by Kevin Rudeforth.
 Reater 3   Contributors include Simon Armitage, Geoff Hattersley, Labbi Siffre, Greta Stoddart, and the first ever published interview with Charles Bukowski (1963), with artwork by David Hernandez.
 Reater 4   From the East Coast of Britain to the West Coast of the States; with accompanying CD of live readings by authors, and paintings by Jayne Jones.
 Reater 5   Contributors include Sean Burn,   Robert Nazarene, B. Z. Niditch and Rosemary Palmeira, with paintings by Dee Rimbaud.

Awards and nominations

Nominated for The Forward Prize for Best First Collection
 Matthew Caley  The Scene of my Former Triumph

References

External links
 Official website for Wrecking Ball Press
 The Reater
 Forward Prizes for Poetry - awards for contemporary poetry

Small press publishing companies
Book publishing companies of the United Kingdom
Poetry publishers